Richard Heaton was a Church of Ireland priest in Ireland.

Heaton was educated at Trinity College, Dublin. He was  appointed Prebendary of Kilrush in Killaloe Cathedral in 1633 and Dean of Clonfert in 1662, holding both positions until his death in 1666. He was an amateur botanist.

References

Deans of Clonfert
1666 deaths
Alumni of Trinity College Dublin
17th-century Irish botanists
17th-century Irish Anglican priests